Adrianne Elizabeth Lenker (born July 9, 1991) is an American musician, best known as the lead vocalist, guitarist and principal songwriter of Big Thief.

Early life
Lenker was born in Indianapolis and was raised in a Christian cult until the age of six, but she primarily grew up in Minnesota. Her parents rented homes in Coon Rapids, Nisswa, and Bloomington, Minnesota, before settling down in Plymouth, Minnesota, where she lived for 10 years. She spent a summer traveling throughout the midwest and living out of a blue Ford cargo van. 

Lenker wrote her first song at the age of eight, and recorded her first album at age 13. Her other interests included studying martial arts, and she was the state karate champion three years in a row. She did not attend high school and instead received her GED at the age of 16. She attended the Berklee College of Music on a scholarship provided by Susan Tedeschi of the Tedeschi Trucks Band.

Career

On February 28, 2006, when Lenker was 14, she released her first solo album, titled Stages of the Sun. On January 9, 2014, Lenker released her second solo album, Hours Were the Birds.

On May 1, 2014, Lenker, together with future bandmate Buck Meek, released the LP records a-sides and b-sides. In 2015, Lenker and Meek, alongside Max Oleartchik and James Krivchenia, formed the band Big Thief, whose first album was released in 2016.

Lenker released her third solo album, Abysskiss, on October 5, 2018.

On October 23, 2020, Lenker released her two most recent albums, Songs and Instrumentals.

Personal life
Lenker met future Big Thief co-founder Buck Meek at a concert when she lived in Boston, and then she encountered him again in a bodega the day she moved to New York. The pair began to play together, and married when Lenker was 24. They divorced in 2018, remaining in Big Thief as "deep friends". In 2019, Lenker was in a relationship with the artist Indigo Sparke, and the two separated sometime in 2020. 

While Lenker is comfortable with the label "queer", she has expressed a desire not to define her sexual orientation beyond that. Her lyrics often contain discussions of gender and the gender binary. In an interview with The Brag, Lenker said of those lyrics, "I feel within myself a constant dialogue between my masculinity, my femininity and the part of me that is neither of those things. I'm just trying to talk about it because I feel like I'm something that is very ambiguous."

Discography

Studio albums

Live albums

Compilation albums

Extended plays

Singles

As lead artist

As featured artist

Awards and nominations

References

External links
Interview with Adrianne Lenker in 2019 at FaceCulture, via YouTube.

Musicians from Indianapolis
Living people
American women singer-songwriters
4AD artists
Saddle Creek Records artists
Berklee College of Music alumni
American LGBT musicians
Queer women
1991 births
Big Thief members
Singer-songwriters from Indiana